Haplocosmia is a genus of Asian tarantulas that was first described by Günter E. W. Schmidt & V. von Wirth in 1996.<ref name=Schm1996>{{cite journal| last1=Schmidt| first1=G.| last2=Wirth| first2=V. von| year=1996| title=Haplocosmia nepalensis gen. et sp. n., die erste Vogelspinne aus Nepal (Araneida: Theraphosidae: Selenocosmiinae)| journal=Arthropoda| pages=12–15| volume=4| author-link=Günter_Schmidt_(arachnologist)}}</ref>  it contains three species, found in Nepal, Himalayas and Tibet: H. himalayana, H. nepalensis and H. sherwoodae'' .

Diagnosis 
They can be distinguished by the spermathecae, which is in one piece, which thorn like hairs on the chelicarea and the scopula on tarsi 1 through 4. The scopula on tarsus 4 is divided by hairs.

See also
 List of Theraphosidae species

References

Theraphosidae genera
Spiders of Asia
Theraphosidae